Leader is a 1984 Soviet drama film directed by Boris Durov.

Plot 
The film tells about a closed boy who came to study in a new class. He wants to decipher the mysterious letters of the disappeared Toltec tribe and is confronted with a misunderstanding of those around him.

Cast 
 Aleksey Volkov
 Aleksandr Strizhenov
 Yekaterina Strizhenova
 Valentina Kareva
 Anatoli Opritov
 Lyubov Strizhenova		
 Anatoli Ganshin
 Vera Solovyova
 Yelena Sarycheva
 Yelena Mochalova

References

External links 
 

1984 films
1980s Russian-language films
Soviet drama films
1984 drama films